Timea Bacsinszky and Vera Zvonareva were the defending champions but lost in the first round to Anna Kalinskaya and Viktória Kužmová.

Margarita Gasparyan and Ekaterina Makarova won the title, defeating Kalinskaya and Kužmová in the final, 7–5, 7–5.

Seeds

Draw

Draw

References
Main Draw

St. Petersburg Ladies' Trophy - Doubles
St. Petersburg Ladies' Trophy